THE HOOPERS (ザ・フーパーズ) are a Japanese pop group. They assume a tomboy style, inspired by the Takarazuka Revue. The group is under Universal Music Japan. Twelve out of five thousand participants were chosen through Fudanjuku's 'Next Generation Audition'. Seven of the chosen participants went on to form The Hoopers, and the remaining five formed AXELL. The Hoopers debuted on March 4, 2015, with 'Loving You' (イトシコイシ君恋シ）(Itoshi koishi kimi koishi). Their eighth member Cecil (who is also an Axell member) was introduced on their single 'Passionate Love' as a permanent member. Later in 2015 they held the Ikemen Audition, where they selected 6 people to become members of Little Hoop (they are described as apprentice members for The Hoopers). Lee of AXELL and Noa of little HOOP joined the group as new members on June 25, 2017, and on July 28, 2017, They released their new single 'Shamrock'. They disbanded on January 25, 2019, with a concert at Kanda Myojin Hall.

History 
 2013 Autumn -  2014 Winter, Fudanjuku announced an audition for their younger group. 12 people from among the 5,000 candidates were chosen. Seven among them became the members of The HOOPERS (and the remaining five became the members of AXELL).
 May 2, 2014, they were first unveiled in the Internet TV "Ikesuta".
 March 4, 2015, Universal Sigma released the 1st single "Itoshi Koishi Kimi Koishi," leading The HOOPERS to their major debut.
 April 2015, as a major debut the first month and simultaneously start two unusual crown program.
 July 6, 2015, Yuhi announced that she would rest for a while due to the poor physical condition. Meanwhile, Axell member, Cecil will serve as the understudy.
 September 29, 2015, it was announced that they were to hold their first one-man LIVE in Amesuta's "Harajuku Kyun Kyun STATION of THE HOOPERS". In addition, the live also served as Yuhi's return to the group.
 November 15, 2015, Nicofest held the first one-man live. Yuhi, who had been on hiatus from July, rejoined and performed with the group. Cecil also joined the group permanently, making the seven to an eight-members group. (Cecil was still in AXELL).
 May 4, 2017, members Yuhi and Mizuki officially graduated from the group.
 June 24, 2017, Lee (AXELL) and Noa (little HOOP) joined as new members.
 July 28, 2017, The HOOPERS released a new single 'SHAMROCK'.
 February 10, 2018, Makoto officially graduated from the group.
 December 6, 2018, they released a statement that they were disbanding on January 25, 2019.

Members

Graduated Members

Timeline

little HOOP

Discography  
With ranking in the Oricon Singles Chart

Single

Album

Live events

Live

2014 
 [11.2] "THE HOOPERS & AXELL no Raibu Hajime mashita Vol.1"

2015 
 [2.22] "THE HOOPERS & AXELL no Raibu Hajime mashita Vol.2"Venue: Shibuya REX 
 [5.5] "I started live THE HOOPERS & AXELL Vol.3" 
 [11.15] "THE HOOPERS / first one-man LIVE !!"  (guest Axell )
 Part 1 "Yuhi Returns! " 
 Part 2 "autumn of Kyun Kyun

2016 
 [2.28] "THE HOOPERS one-man LIVE Vol.2" 
 [3.27] "THE HOOPERS one-man LIVE Vol.3"  
 [5.5] "THE HOOPERS one-man LIVE Vol.4"  
 [6.12] "THE HOOPERS one-man LIVE Vol.5" 
 [7.24] "Make Happy~ Mirai"
 [10.30] "1st ALBUM「FANTASIA」Release & Yume no Halloween Party"
 [11.23] "THE HOOPERSxSanrio Puroland Yume no Stage"
 [12.25] "THE HOOPERS no onagokai~ Christmas

2017 
 [1.21] "Kamakura LOOP OPENING LIVE〜Mirai(THE HOOPERS)×TAMATE BOX〜"
 [3.18-19] "TOUR FANTASIA 2017"
 [6.24] "NEW POWER GENERATION"

Events

2015 
 [3.23] "Spring of PON festival!" 
 [5.9] "oricon Sound Blowin'2015 ~ spring ~" 
 [5.23] "iPop Monthly Fes Vol.41"
 [5.23] "CBC Radio Summer Festival 2015" 
 [8.8] "Kyun Fes" 
 [8.22] "24-hour TV ~ Love Saves the Earth -"
 [12.31 - 2016.1.1] "Tokyo Joypolis Countdown Party 2016"

2016 
 [2.11] "ch FILES St. Valentine Party"
 [4.29] " Nico Nico Choukaigi"
 [7.9] "ESP Gakuen presents COLOR 2016"
 [8.11] "Kyun Fes. 2016"
 [8.12] "HARAJUKU SUMMER PARTY"
 [8.25] "Mezamashi Raibu"
 [9.3] "East Asia Music Festival"
 [10.15] "109Night"
 [11.26, 11.27] "HYPER JAPAN" in London

Joint live/ events

2014 
[5.18] "C/MENZ presents TOKYO Chenmen Collection 2014"
[8.2-3] " TOKYO IDOL FESTIVAL 2014 "

2015 
 [5.30] "Minikore IKE-MENS COLLECTION vol.4 Special Edition" 
 [6.11] "OTODAMA SEA STUDIO ~ KISS ME ON THE BEACH 2015~" 
 [8.1-2] "TOKYO IDOL FESTIVAL 2015"
 [9.20] " Inazuma Rock Fes 2015 " 
Mirai was absent due to poor health
 [10.24] "Banmon! Fes."
 [10.25] "CANDY PANTS 6th Anniversary !!" 
 [11.3] "Nakano flow Idol Festival" 
 [11.21] "Sora FES" 
 [11.22]"JOL*fes"
 Performed twice, day and night
 [11.23]"click clap Party !!" 
 Appeared at night

2016 
[3.13] "DMM.yell Live 2016 in Shinjuku ReNY
[3.13] "FabFes. 2016 SPRING"
[4.24] "iCON DOLL LOUNGE"
 Mirai, Yuhi, and Haruki took part in the fashion show
[7.18] "OTODAMA SEA STUDIO 2016~Bachelor Beach Girl 2016' supported by movement~"
[7.30] "a-nation island &stadium fes.2016 powered by dTV"
[8.6] "TOKYO IDOL FESTIVAL 2016"
[8.31] Ikemen Semit 2016~SUMMER"
[9.25] @JAMxNatari EXPO 2016
[10.15] "Sports of Heart Music Fes 2016"
[10.23] "EXTENSION vo.2"

2017 
 [1.5]"FLASH 3rd Supported by WEGO"

Cast

TV 
 Fuji TV " time ~MUSIC HOUR~ of Music "(February 27, 2015) 
Fuji TV " Myusata "(March 6, 2015) 
Nippon Television " Music Dragon "(March 6, 2015) 
TV Asahi " Onegai! Morning "(March 12, 2015) - Sena 
TBS " Live B "(March 31, 2015)
 BS Fuji "THE HOOPERS no KyunKyun Sase Night" (April 5, 2015 - July 12) 
Fuji TV TWO "HOOPERS TV" (April 12, 2015 - June 21, a total of six episodes) 
Fuji TV "2020 Hanamaru Daikichi" (May 29, 2015) 
NHK General " Masakame TV "(May 30, 2015, December 12) - Mizuki 
NHK General " MUSIC JAPAN "(June 8, 2015) 
Fuji TV " TOKYO IDOL TV "(November 19, 2015, December 3) - Sena
[2016.1.19]TV Tokyo "Doubutsu BANG!!" - Sena, Mizuki, Cecil
[2016.3.22]TOKYO MX "Otomono Gatari" - Sena, Mirai, Makoto
[2016.5.21]Tokyo MX "Otopoke POPS" - Sena, Mirai, Yuhi, Mizuki
[2016.12.5]Nihon Kai TV "Kimidake TV" - Regulars starting December 5

Network distribution 
[2014.5.16- 12.5] ustream "THE HOOPERS&AXELL no mae hajime mashita" 
[2015.1.14] Showroom"THE HOOPERS no ka Show kukai"  
[2015.5.27] Nico Nico Live "Nicoraji!" - Mirai, Mizuki, Haruki
[2015.8.26] Nico Nico Live "Nicoraji!" - Mirai, Sena, Haruki, Cecil 
[2015.9.5, 9.12] Showroom "Yokohama DeNA BayStars official game live coverage" - Makoto (Assistant) 
[2015.9.15] Amesuta "Harajuku Kyun Kyun STATION of THE HOOPERS"
[2015.11.30] Amesuta "Harajuku Party 7" - Sena, Yuhi, Cecil
[2016.5.5] Nico Nico Live "Nishikawa takari no einomi"
[2015.5.6] Nico Nico Live "Nicoraji!" - Mirai, Mizuki
[2016.6]  Nico Nico Live "Nicoraji!" -Mizuki, Haruki (both Assistants)
-On the 10, Sena was filling in for Mizuki and on the 17th Cecil was filling for Haruki
[2016.10.16, 12.18]AbemaTV "Abema Entame Sunday"

Radio 
 "All Night Nippon R of THE HOOPERS" ( Nippon Broadcasting System, May 30, 2015)

Other 
Stage 
 "Danganronpa THE STAGE 2016" (2016.6.16-7.16) - Chihiro（Mizuki）
Voice Acting 
 Thousand Memories - Sena
 TO BE HERO - Shota (Sena)
Magazine 
 KERA (January 2016 Issue) Haruki's Model debut
Held Kera Shop Tour around Nagoya, Kabe, Osaka on August 14, 2016

References

External links 
THE HOOPERS official website*closed
THE HOOPERS profile on Universal Music Japan
THE HOOPERS Official Blog
 Twitter

 YouTube
THE HOOPERS - 
Mirai - 
Cecil - 
 TikTok
THE HOOPERS ( the__hoopers ) - TikTok
Lee ( lee_nova_10 ) - TikTok
Mirai ( vanbe666m ) - TikTok
 Instagram
Noa ( noa_1883 ) - Instagram
Lee ( lee_nova_10 ) - Instagram
Cecil ( cecil__0207 ) - Instagram
Sena ( sena_littlestar ) - Instagram
Haruki ( haruki_silvon ) - Instagram

Universal Music Japan artists
Japanese idol groups